Gracefulness, or being graceful, is the physical characteristic of displaying "pretty agility", in the form of elegant movement, poise, or balance. The etymological root of grace is the Latin word gratia from gratus, meaning pleasing. Gracefulness has been described by reference to its being aesthetically pleasing. For example, Edmund Burke wrote:

The difficulty in defining exactly what constitutes gracefulness is described in this analysis of Henri Bergson's use of the term:

Gracefulness is often referenced by simile, with people often being described as being "as graceful as a swan", or "as graceful as a ballerina". The concept of gracefulness is applied both to movement, and to inanimate objects. For example, certain trees are commonly referred to as being "graceful", such as the Betula albosinensis, Prunus × yedoensis (Yoshino cherry), and Areca catechu (betel-nut palm).

Gracefulness is sometimes confused with gracility, or slenderness, although the latter word is derived from a different root, the Latin adjective gracilis (masculine or feminine), or gracile (neuter) which in either form means slender, and when transferred for example to discourse, takes the sense of "without ornament", "simple", or various similar connotations. The Shorter Oxford English Dictionary remarks of gracility, for example: Recently misused (through association with grace) for Gracefully slender. This misuse is unfortunate at least, because the terms gracile and grace are completely unrelated: the etymological root of grace is the Latin word gratia from gratus, meaning pleasing and nothing to do with slenderness or thinness.

References

See also
Fine motor skill
Grace (disambiguation)
Kama
Majesty
Peak experiences

Aptitude